In the Chicago mayoral election of 1869, Citizens Party nominee Roswell B. Mason defeated Republican nominee George W. Gage by a landslide 27-point margin.

This was the last mayoral election before the Great Chicago Fire took place.

Citizens Party candidate Mason was an executive in the Illinois Central Railroad. Republican Party candidate Gage was a businessman who operated the Tremont House and Sherman House hotels.

The Citizens Reform ticket was a nonpartisan reform slate which aimed to challenge the power of German Republican political boss Anton C. Hesing.

Results

Aftermath
Mason would only serve a single term as mayor. Gage would go on to serve as the president of the Chicago White Stockings baseball team (today's Chicago Cubs) and serve as Chicago's South Parks Commissioner (during which time he commissioned a park which would subsequently bear his name).

References

Mayoral elections in Chicago
Chicago
Chicago
1860s in Chicago